Double Dragon may refer to:

 Double Dragon, a 1987 video game series produced by Technōs Japan Corporation
 Double Dragon (video game), 1987 video game, first game of the aforementioned series
 Double Dragon (TV series), 1993 animated TV series, based on the aforementioned video game series
 Double Dragon (film), 1994 film, based on the aforementioned video game series
 Double Dragon (Neo Geo), 1995 fighting video game based on the 1994 film
 DoubleDragon Properties, Philippine real estate development company
 Double Dragon Publishing, Canadian literary publisher founded in 2000, specializing in e-books
 Double Dragon (band), Australian heavy metal band from Adelaide, South Australia, formed 2003
 Double Dragon (music producer), Hip-Hop/R&B music production brothers
 Order of the Double Dragon an order awarded by Qing Dynasty Empire of China
 Double Dragon (hacking organization)
 Double Dragon (restaurant), a restaurant and bar in Portland, Oregon, U.S.

See also

 Dragon (disambiguation)
 Double (disambiguation)
 Hong (rainbow-dragon) a two-headed dragon of Chinese mythology
 Twin Dragon (disambiguation)
 Dragon II (disambiguation)